Railway Systems of Zambia Limited (RSZ) was a private company incorporated and registered in Zambia which operates Zambia Railways. It is a subsidiary of NLPI Ltd, an investment holding company, which main investment is focus on infrastructure-related projects within the continent of Africa.

The shareholders of NLPI are Nedbank Ltd, Old Mutual and Sanlam, all major South African financial institutions, together with New Limpopo Bridge Projects Limited (NLP).

Zambia railways concession
The NLPI Consortium participated in a tender, administered by the World Bank, in respect of the Zambia Railways Concession, in order to ensure a "Through Traffic" pre-arrangement along the Corridor from Durban to Lusaka and beyond.  The Consortium was declared the winner with the signing of the Freight Concession Agreement on 14 February 2003, by the Minister of Finance and National Planning of the Republic of Zambia, as well as representatives of the NLPI Consortium.

The Consortium made a provision of US$40 million for the rehabilitation of Zambia Railways.  The World Bank funded an additional investment of approximately US$30 million to finance Zambia Railways staff retrenchment packages, locomotive rehabilitation and other related projects.

Zambia Railways, which comprises over 900 kilometres of mainline railways and + 300 kilometres of branch line railway, is one of the largest rail networks within the region

The Zambia Concession, which covers the entire network from the Sakania Border to Victoria Falls, including the Copper Belt and other branch lines, not only constitutes one of the largest ever acquisitions in Zambia's history, but is also unique, as it is Zambia's first railway concession.

The Concession should not be viewed in isolation but as part of a global effort by NLPI to alleviate railway, and other related transport, problems within the region.

The Government of the Republic of Zambia terminated the concession contract on 11 September 2012,  but RSZ dispute the grounds for termination.

See also 
 Rail transport in Zambia
 Transport in Zambia

References

External links
 Company website

Railway companies of Zambia
3 ft 6 in gauge railways in Zambia
Companies with year of establishment missing

it:Beitbridge Bulawayo Railway
fi:Beitbridge Bulawayo Railway